Kamel Al Mousa [كامل الموسى in Arabic] (born 29 August 1982) is a former Saudi Arabian football player. He previously played for Al-Wahda FC, Al-Hilal, Al-Ahli, and the Saudi Arabia national team.

Career
In 2002 at age 19, Kamel signed for Al-Wahda from Wej SC. He then spent time at the club but in 2006 he was loaned out to Al-Hilal. Kamel spent the whole season there, but upon his return to Al-Wahda, he received more playing time and eventually became a regular player for the team, eventually reaching the coveted 100th appearance for his club. In 2010, Kamel signed for Al-Ahli. He spent 5 full seasons at the club but in 2016, he signed on a free transfer to return to Al-Wahda. But after one season on 5 November 2017, Kamel Al-Mousa announced his retirement from football.

Kamel has 4 brothers who are or were professional footballers. His brother Rabee Al-Mousa also played for Al-Ahli and he most recently played for Al-Wahda. His brother Rayan Al-Mousa is currently playing for Al-Ahli. His brother Redwan Al-Mousa is currently not on a roster but he most recently played for Al-Ansar. His brother Moataz Al-Mousa is a retired player who most recently played for Al-Wahda.

International career
he played for Saudi Arabia national football team as in AFC Asian Cup 2007 and AFC Asian Cup 2011

Club Goals

Honours

Club
 With Al-Wahda FC
Saudi First Division: 2002–03
 With Al-Hilal
Saudi Crown Prince Cup: 2006
 With Al-Ahli
Saudi Champions Cup: 2011, 2012, 2016
Saudi Crown Prince Cup: 2014–15
Saudi Professional League: 2015–16

International 
Saudi Arabia
AFC Asian Cup
2007 : Runner up
2011 : Group Stage
Islamic Solidarity Games: 2005

References

Living people
1982 births
Saudi Arabian footballers
Saudi Arabia international footballers
2007 AFC Asian Cup players
2011 AFC Asian Cup players
Association football defenders
Wej SC players
Al-Wehda Club (Mecca) players
Al Hilal SFC players
Al-Ahli Saudi FC players
Saudi Professional League players
Sportspeople from Mecca